Claud E. Kitchens Outdoor School at Fairview, formerly known as Fairview Outdoor School and Fairview Outdoor Education Center, is a public school located between Clear Spring and Hancock in western Washington County, Maryland, United States. The school was built in 1979 and serves students in the Washington County Public Schools system as a facility to promote environmental awareness.

The school was renamed as of 9 December 2008 to honor the late former Washington County Public Schools superintendent Claud E. Kitchens, who oversaw the construction of the facility.

Notes

External links
Official Site
Washington County Public Schools: Fairview Outdoor School

Public schools in Washington County, Maryland
Environmental education in the United States